Andrew Woods may refer to:

 Andrew W. Woods (born 1964), professor at the University of Cambridge
 Andrew Woods (archaeologist), British numismatist and archaeologist 
 Andrew Woods from The Real World: D.C.

See also
 Andrew Wood (disambiguation)